Karim Betina is a Paralympian athlete from Algeria competing mainly in category F32 shot put and club throw events.

Karim is a two time Paralympic champion in the F32 shot put, winning the gold medal in both Athens, Greece in 2004 and in Beijing, China in 2008. He also won the bronze medal in the club throw in the F32/51 class in 2004.

External links
 

Paralympic athletes of Algeria
Athletes (track and field) at the 2004 Summer Paralympics
Athletes (track and field) at the 2008 Summer Paralympics
Paralympic gold medalists for Algeria
Paralympic silver medalists for Algeria
Paralympic bronze medalists for Algeria
Living people
World record holders in Paralympic athletics
Medalists at the 2004 Summer Paralympics
Medalists at the 2008 Summer Paralympics
Medalists at the 2012 Summer Paralympics
Athletes (track and field) at the 2012 Summer Paralympics
Year of birth missing (living people)
Paralympic medalists in athletics (track and field)
21st-century Algerian women
Algerian female shot putters
20th-century Algerian women